Joseph O. Rogers Jr. (October 8, 1921 – April 6, 1999) was an American politician. He served as a Democratic member of the South Carolina House of Representatives.

Life and career 
Rogers was born in Mullins, South Carolina, the son of Lila McDonald and Joseph Oscar Rogers. He attended Charleston High School, the College of Charleston, The Citadel and the University of South Carolina School of Law.

In 1955, Rogers was elected to the South Carolina House of Representatives, serving until 1966, when he was a Republican candidate for governor of South Carolina, losing against Robert Evander McNair.

In 1969, Rogers served as United States Attorney for the District of South Carolina, serving until 1970.

Rogers died in April 1999, at the age of 77.

References 

1921 births
1999 deaths
People from Mullins, South Carolina
Democratic Party members of the South Carolina House of Representatives
South Carolina Republicans
United States Attorneys for the District of South Carolina
20th-century American politicians
College of Charleston alumni
The Citadel, The Military College of South Carolina alumni
University of South Carolina School of Law alumni